The Radclyffe School is a mixed comprehensive school  for 11- to 16-year-olds, located in Chadderton, Greater Manchester, England.

History

Grammar school
The school was originally called Chadderton Grammar School and opened in 1930. It was officially opened in October 1930 by David Lindsay, 27th Earl of Crawford. It had 300 boys and girls, which rose to 700 in 1950 and 900 by 1958. It was decided to split the school into two schools – a boys' and girls'. This provoked protests from parents. In 1959, the school became Chadderton Grammar School for Girls with around 600 girls in the 1960s. The boys' school, a grammar-technical school, was on Chadderton Hall Road.

Comprehensive
It was renamed Mid Chadderton Comprehensive School after grammar schools were abolished in September 1975, and the boys' school became the North Chadderton School. The two sites of the North Chadderton Secondary Modern School were split between the two new schools based on the former girls' and boys' schools. The name "Radclyffe" was taken from a local land-owning family in the 19th century who had owned the land that the schools stood upon.

The school was originally located across two sites – the Lower School (Years 7–9) on Broadway and the Upper School (Years 10 & 11) on Hunt Lane. However, in 2008 a new state of the art school was built at the Hunt Lane site, housing both the lower and upper school students.

Notable former pupils

 Kyle Eastmond, rugby union Bath Rugby
 Craig Gill, drummer with The Inspiral Carpets
 Dominique Jackson, actress in Hollyoaks
 Mark Jordon,  actor in Emmerdale
 Graham Lambert, guitarist with The Inspiral Carpets
 Sally Whittaker, actress in Coronation Street

Chadderton Grammar School for Girls
 Vera Baird, author, Labour MP from 2001-10 for Redcar
 Dame Mavis McDonald

Chadderton Grammar School
 Sir Ron Hadfield, Chief Constable from 1990–96 of West Midlands Police 
 Alan Rothwell, Coronation Street and Brookside actor
 John Stalker, former policeman and former deputy Chief Constable of Greater Manchester Police

References

External links
 The Official website
 Fast & Furious Competition
 EduBase

Foundation schools in the Metropolitan Borough of Oldham
Secondary schools in the Metropolitan Borough of Oldham
Chadderton
 01
Educational institutions established in 1930
1930 establishments in England